Amanda Callaghan FRES is an entomologist in the United Kingdom.

Education and career 
Callaghan was awarded a PhD in Insect Biochemistry from the London School of Hygiene and Tropical Medicine in 1989, she then moved to the University of Montpellier as a Royal Society Science Exchange fellow.

Since 1990 she has been based at the University of Reading, where she is Professor of Invertebrate Zoology and is also Curator of the Cole Museum of Zoology.

Research 
Her research looks at freshwater invertebrates and she specialises in British mosquitoes, and the microplastic pollution and ecotoxicology of freshwater invertebrates.

Callaghan has showed that in lab experiments mosquito larvae can feed on microplastic particles and these will remain in their bodies when they metamorphose through to a pupa and then a flying adult mosquito.

She monitors British mosquito species to look at whether their distribution and behaviour is changing in response to global climate change and whether there might be a risk of Malaria disease transmission in Northern Europe. In particular she has highlighted that the use of water butts in UK gardens can create a habitat in which female mosquitoes can lay their eggs.

External links 

 University of Reading profile

References 

Living people
Year of birth missing (living people)
British entomologists
Women entomologists
Fellows of the Royal Entomological Society
Alumni of the London School of Hygiene & Tropical Medicine
Academics of the University of Reading
20th-century British scientists
20th-century British women scientists
21st-century British scientists
21st-century British women scientists